Pretty Things is an album by jazz saxophonist Lou Donaldson recorded for the Blue Note label featuring Donaldson with Blue Mitchell, Leon Spencer, Ted Dunbar, and Idris Muhammad and one track with Lonnie Smith and Melvin Sparks replacing Spencer & Dunbar and Jimmy Lewis added.

Reception
The album was awarded 2 stars in an Allmusic review by Scott Yanow who states "Lou Donaldson has recorded many strong sessions throughout his career but this CD reissue brings back one of the less-significant ones... there are many better Donaldson recordings to acquire first".

Track listing
All compositions by Lou Donaldson except as indicated
 "Tennessee Waltz" (Pee Wee King, Redd Stewart) – 6:30
 "Curtis' Song" (Leon Spencer) – 5:45
 "Sassie Lassie" (Harold Ousley) – 6:25
 "Just for a Thrill" (Lil Armstrong, Don Raye) – 5:20
 "Pot Belly" – 8:05
 "Love" (Milt Gabler, Bert Kaempfert) – 5:57
Recorded at Rudy Van Gelder Studio, Englewood Cliffs, NJ on January 9, 1970 (track 1) and June 12, 1970 (tracks 2–6).

Personnel
Lou Donaldson – varitone alto saxophone, vocals
Blue Mitchell – trumpet
Lonnie Smith (track 1), Leon Spencer (tracks 2–6) – organ
Melvin Sparks (track 1), Ted Dunbar (tracks 2–6) – guitar
Jimmy Lewis  – electric bass (track 1)
Idris Muhammad – drums

References

Lou Donaldson albums
1970 albums
Albums produced by Francis Wolff
Blue Note Records albums
Albums recorded at Van Gelder Studio